Bikya (also known as Furu) is a potentially extinct Southern Bantoid language spoken in Cameroon. It is one of the three, or four, Furu languages. In 1986 four surviving speakers were identified, although only one (a man in his seventies) spoke the language fluently.

English linguist Dr. David Dalby filmed an 87-year-old African woman who spoke Bikya as her native tongue. At the time, it was believed that she was the last Bikya speaker.

It, and presumably all of Furu, is perhaps a Beboid language (Blench 2011).

Bibliography
Breton, Roland (1995) 'Les Furu et leur voisins', Cahier Sciences Humaines, 31, 1, 17–48.
Breton, Roland (1993) "Is there a Furu Language Group? An investigation on the Cameroon-Nigeria Border", The Journal of West African Languages, 23, 2, 97–98.
 Blench, Roger (2011) 'The membership and internal structure of Bantoid and the border with Bantu'. Bantu IV, Humboldt University, Berlin.

References

Furu languages
Languages of Cameroon
Endangered languages of Africa